Vidyadhiraja Vidya Bhavan Higher Secondary School (VVBHSS) is an educational institution in Aluva, Kerala, India. It is functioning under the Geetha Bhavan Trust formed by Swami Gopalananda Theertha.

Notable alumni
 Siju Wilson, Actor 
 Dileep, actor

References

Schools in Ernakulam district
High schools and secondary schools in Kerala
Aluva
Educational institutions in India with year of establishment missing